Andre Begemann and Tim Pütz were the defending champion, but Begemann decided not to compete this year. Pütz played alongside Dominik Meffert and reached the final.

Mateusz Kowalczyk and Igor Zelenay won the title, defeating Pütz and Meffert in the final, 6–4, 6–3.

Seeds

Draw

References
 Main Draw

Heilbronner Neckarcup - Doubles
2015 Doubles